The Great Mr. Nobody is a 1941 American comedy film directed by Benjamin Stoloff and written by Ben Markson and Kenneth Gamet. The film stars Eddie Albert, Joan Leslie, Alan Hale, Sr., William Lundigan, John Litel, Charles Trowbridge and Paul Hurst. The film was released by Warner Bros. on February 15, 1941.

Plot

Cast 
 Eddie Albert as Robert 'Dreamy' Smith
 Joan Leslie as Mary Clover
 Alan Hale, Sr. as 'Skipper' Martin
 William Lundigan as Richard Amesworth
 John Litel as John Wade
 Charles Trowbridge as Grover Dillon
 Paul Hurst as Michael O'Connor
 Dickie Moore as 'Limpy' Barnes
 John Ridgely as Eddie Williams
 Douglas Kennedy as Mr. McGraw
 George Campeau as Mr. Hanes
 William "Billy" Benedict as Jig 
 Helen MacKellar as Mrs. Barnes
 Joyce Tucker as Janet Barnes
 Mary Field as Miss Frame

References

External links 
 
 
 
 

1941 films
1941 comedy-drama films
American comedy-drama films
American black-and-white films
Films about journalists
Films directed by Benjamin Stoloff
Films scored by Adolph Deutsch
Warner Bros. films
1940s English-language films
1940s American films